Undermind may refer to:
 Undermind (album), a 2004 album by Phish
 Undermind (film), a 2003 U.S. film
 Undermind (TV series), a 1965 UK science fiction television drama